Arba Va Akhmas (also Romanized as Arbā‘ Va Akhmās) is a village in Hoveyzeh Rural District, in the Central District of Hoveyzeh County, Khuzestan Province, Iran. At the 2006 census, its population was 31, in 4 families.

References 

Populated places in Hoveyzeh County